Butler Parr (9 November 1810 – 16 March 1872) was an English first-class cricketer active 1835–54 who played for Nottingham and Nottinghamshire. He was born in Marton, Lincolnshire and died in Radcliffe-on-Trent. The father-in-law of Richard Daft, he appeared in 23 first-class matches.

Notes

1810 births
1872 deaths
English cricketers
North v South cricketers
Nottinghamshire cricketers
Gentlemen of Nottinghamshire cricketers
Players of Nottinghamshire cricketers